Oscar Wilhelm Mathisen (4 October 1888 – 10 April 1954) was a Norwegian speed skater and celebrity, almost rivalling Roald Amundsen and Fridtjof Nansen as symbols for a young nation (Norway became independent in 1905). He represented Kristiania Skøiteklub (now Oslo Skøiteklub).

Short biography
Oscar Mathisen was born in Kristiania (now Oslo) as the youngest of seven children. His parents, Carl Anton Mathisen (born in Østre Toten in 1852) and Pauline Mathisen (born in Vang, Hedmark in 1853), had five sons and two daughters: Carl Markus (1875), Petter Jørgen (1877), Johan Ingval (1879), Agnis Pauline (1880), Sigurd Valdemar (1883), Margit Antoni (1885), and Oscar Wilhelm (1888), all born in Kristiania.

Oscar Mathisen was National Champion in 1907 at the age of 18, and became World Champion the following year (four years after his brother Sigurd Mathisen), despite falling on the 500 m. During his career, he set 14 world records, with his 1,500 m record from 1914 standing unrivalled for 23 years. The day before he set that 1,500 m record, he had broken Jaap Eden's world record on the 5,000 m and thereby had become the world record holder on all distances. He became World Allround Champion five times, a record that stood until 2013 when it was broken by Sven Kramer, and European Allround Champion three times.

After World War I, he became a professional skater and he was Professional World Champion in 1920. He continued his skating career until 1929. In that last year of his career, then 40 years old, he went to Davos, where people were preparing for the European Championships, and proved that he could still skate fast by beating the world record times on both the 500 m and the 1,000 m, although his times were not recognised as world records because he was a professional skater.

Mathisen always was a gentleman in defeat and showed genuine respect towards skaters who had beaten him and top skaters afterwards, as illustrated by his losses against Nikolay Strunnikov and his message to Oleg Goncharenko. His life ended tragically, as  Mathisen killed his wife and then himself after his wife had suffered from severe depression for many years.

In 1959, a statue of Mathisen was erected outside of Frogner stadion in Oslo, where he celebrated many of his triumphs. Every year since 1959, the Oscar Mathisen Memorial Trophy is awarded to the most outstanding speed skating performance of the season.

Medals
An overview of medals won by Mathisen at important championships he participated in, listing the years in which he won each:

Sources: SpeedSkatingStats.com & Skoyteforbundet.no

Records

World records
Over the course of his career, Mathisen skated 14 world records:

Source: SpeedSkatingStats.com

Personal records
To put these personal records in perspective, the Notes column lists the official world records on the dates that Mathisen skated his personal records.

|-

|-

|-

|-

|-

|-

Source: EvertStenlund.se

Note that Mathisen's personal records on the 500 m and the 1,000 m were not recognised as world records by the International Skating Union (ISU) because Mathisen was a professional skater when he set those.

Apart from on the 3,000 m, every one of these personal records was faster than the official world record on the given distance at the time, while in most cases, Mathisen himself already was the world record holder. As for the 3,000 m, this was not an official world record event, as governed by the ISU, until 1932. Both the first official world record on this distance (by Clas Thunberg in 1932) and the second one (by Michael Staksrud in 1933) were actually slower than Mathisen's personal record. When Ivar Ballangrud set the third official world record on the 3,000 m in 1935, the 3,000 m world record finally was faster than Mathisen's personal record.

Mathisen has an Adelskalender score of 192.560 points. He held first place on the Adelskalender for 7,649 days between 1909 and 1930, more than twice as long as anyone else. The number two on the list of people who led the Adelskalender for the highest number of days is Ivar Ballangrud (who actually replaced Mathisen at the top of the Adelskalender) with 3,675 days.

References

Bibliography

 Eng, Trond. All Time International Championships, Complete Results: 1889 – 2002. Askim, Norway: WSSSA-Skøytenytt, 2002.
 Eng, Trond; Gjerde, Arild and Teigen, Magne. Norsk Skøytestatistikk Gjennom Tidene, Menn/Kvinner, 1999 (6. utgave). Askim/Skedsmokorset/Veggli, Norway: WSSSA-Skøytenytt, 1999. 
 Eng, Trond; Gjerde, Arild; Teigen, Magne and Teigen, Thorleiv. Norsk Skøytestatistikk Gjennom Tidene, Menn/Kvinner, 2004 (7. utgave). Askim/Skedsmokorset/Veggli/Hokksund, Norway: WSSSA-Skøytenytt, 2004. 
 Eng, Trond and Teigen, Magne. Komplette Resultater fra offisielle Norske Mesterskap på skøyter, 1894 – 2005. Askim/Veggli, Norway: WSSSA-Skøytenytt, 2005.
 Mathisen, Oscar. Mitt Livs Løp (in Norwegian). Oslo, Norway: Dybwad, 1946. (Autobiography)
 Teigen, Magne. Komplette Resultater Norske Mesterskap På Skøyter, 1887 – 1989: Menn/Kvinner, Senior/Junior. Veggli, Norway: WSSSA-Skøytenytt, 1989.
 Teigen, Magne. Komplette Resultater Internasjonale Mesterskap 1889 – 1989: Menn/Kvinner, Senior/Junior, allround/sprint. Veggli, Norway: WSSSA-Skøytenytt, 1989.

External links

 Oscar Mathisen at SpeedSkatingStats.com
 The skating days of Oscar Mathisen in diary form at ortygia.no
 Oscar Mathisen. Deutsche Eisschnelllauf Gemeinschaft e.V. (German Skating Association).
 Historical World Records. International Skating Union.
 National Championships results. Norges Skøyteforbund (Norwegian Skating Association).

1888 births
1954 suicides
Sportspeople from Oslo
World record setters in speed skating
Norwegian male speed skaters
Murder–suicides in Europe
Suicides by firearm in Norway
World Allround Speed Skating Championships medalists
1954 deaths